Sylvia Kerckhoff (born 1928) is an American politician who served as the mayor of Durham, North Carolina, from 1993 to 1997.

Early life and education 
Kerckhoff was born in Toledo, Ohio, in 1928. She graduated from the University of Wisconsin–Madison in 1950 with a degree in psychology and later went to Duke University, from which she graduated in 1960 with a Master of Arts in history and education.

Career
Kerckhoff became Durham's first female mayor after defeating incumbent Harry Rodenhizer in the 1993 Durham mayoral election. She was reelected the 1995 Durham mayoral election.

See also
List of first women mayors

References

1928 births
Living people
Mayors of Durham, North Carolina
University of Wisconsin–Madison College of Letters and Science alumni
Duke University alumni